Thomas Travers may refer to:

Thomas Otho Travers (1785–1844), soldier
Thomas Travers (MP), for Lancashire
 Sir Thomas Travers (ophthalmologist), Australian ophthalmologist